James H. Geer is an American psychologist. His area of research is sexuality.

Career 
Geer has researched sexuality for over 30 years. He explores the psychophysiology of sexual arousal and cognitive variables in sexuality. He worked on the faculty at University at Buffalo, University of Pennsylvania, and Stony Brook University. He retired from his position at Louisiana State University and moved to the Lancaster area to work as a visiting scholar at Franklin & Marshall College.

Selected works

Books

References 

Living people
Year of birth missing (living people)
20th-century American scientists
20th-century American psychologists
21st-century American scientists
21st-century American psychologists
University at Buffalo faculty
University of Pennsylvania faculty
Stony Brook University faculty
Louisiana State University faculty
Franklin & Marshall College faculty